Carlo Ljubek (born May 21, 1976 in Bocholt, North Rhine-Westphalia) is a German actor.

Life 

Carlo Ljubek was born as a son of Croatian migrants in Bocholt, Germany. He graduated after his actor's training 2002 in Munich, Germany at the Otto-Falckenberg-School. At the intimate theatre of Munich, which is affiliated to the school he performed among other plays in Shakespeares What You Will. Since summer 2007 he is employed at the playhouse Cologne, where he was very successfully seen as Siegfried (Nibelungen saga) and Jason ("The Golden Fleece").

After a few appearances on German TV he further played in movie productions, such as Sherry Hormans "Guys and Balls" or Stefan Komandarev's "The World Is Big and Salvation Lurks Around the Corner" (based on the novel of Ilija Trojanow)

He is married to the actress Maja Schöne and they have a daughter. [2]

Theater

1999 to 2002, Muenchner Kammerspiele 
 Golem, director: Carsten Dane, Christopher Blenkinsop
 Twelfth Night (or What You Will) (Shakespeare), director: Erich Siedler
 , director: Dominik Flaschka

2002 to 2007, Staatstheater Wiesbaden 
 A Midsummer Night's Dream (Shakespeare), director: Manfred Beilharz, role: Lysander 
 Don Carlos (Schiller), director: András Fricsay, role: Don Carlos
 Hamlet (Shakespeare), director: Tilman Gersch, role: Hamlet
  (Coline Serreau), director: Pavel Mikulastik, roles: policeman 1, narrator, little soldier
  (John von Düffel), director: Beat Fäh role: Manuel
 Leonce and Lena (Georg Büchner), director: Tilman Gersch, role: Leonce
  (Wassilij Sigarew), director: Rüdiger Burbach, role: Maxim
 What You Will (Shakespeare), director: Tillmann Gersch, roles: Fabian, Sebastian

2007 to 2009  playhouse Cologne 
  (Friedrich Hebbel), director: Karin Beier, roles: Siegfried, Etzels footman
 The Misanthrope (Molière), director: Karin Henkel, role: Philinte
 The Golden Fleece (Franz Grillparzer), director: Karin Beier, roles: Jason, Phryxus
 Faust Teil 1 (Johann Wolfgang von Goethe), director: Laurent Chétouane
  (Juli Zeh), director: Jette Steckel, role: Alev

Film / TV 
 2000:  (short)
 2000: 
 2001: 
 2004: Going Home
 2004: 
 2004: Guys and Balls
 2004: Off Beat 
 2005: Gisela
 2005: 
 2006: 
 2006: 
 2006: 
 2004: 
 2004: Lulu
 2006: 
 2006: 
 2007: 
 2007: The World is Big and Salvation Lurks Around the Corner
 2007:  (written by Bernd Eichinger)
 2007: 
 2008: 
 2008:  (short)
 2008: 
 2010: Shahada
 2013: West
 2017: Luna

External links 
 www.ljubek-fan.de first and only fan homepage

References

1976 births
Living people
People from Bocholt, Germany
German people of Croatian descent
German male stage actors
German male television actors
German male film actors